The Kirksville Osteopaths were a minor league baseball team based in Kirksville, Missouri. In 1911, the Osteopaths played as members of the short–lived Class D level Missouri State League. Kirksville was home to the Kirksville College of Osteopathic Medicine in the era, reflected in the team name.

History
Minor league baseball began in Kirksville in 1911. The Kirksville Osteopaths played as charter members of the Class D level Missouri State League. The "Osteopaths" moniker was a reflection of Kirksville serving as home to the Kirksville College of Osteopathic Medicine, known today as A.T. Still University.

The 1911 Missouri State League began play in its first season as a five–team league, with the Brookfield Hustlers, Jefferson City Senators, Macon Athletics and Sedalia Cubs joining Kirksville as the charter members. The Missouri State League had immediate issues as the Brookfield Hustlers franchise folded on May 19, 1911. Shortly after Brookfield folded, the Sedalia Cubs moved to Brookfield on May 24, 1911. When the Jefferson City Senators folded from the four–team league on June 2, 1911, its demise caused the Missouri State League to permanently fold on June 5, 1911. Kirksville was in 3rd place with an 9–12 record under manager Senter Reiney when the franchise permanently folded.

During the season, the Kirksville Osteopaths played a 20–inning game against the Macon Athletics on May 25, 1911. Kirksville won the game 2–1.

Kirksville, Missouri has not hosted another minor league baseball team.

A college football team with the same "Kirksville Osteopaths" name played in the same era. The football team lost a game 150–0 to the Missouri School of Mines on November 12, 1914.

The ballpark
The name of the home minor league ballpark for the Kirksville Osteopaths is not directly referenced. As Kirksville was home to two colleges in the era, college baseball was played on the campus of the North Missouri Normal School and Commercial College, known today as Truman State University and at its namesake Kirksville College of Osteopathic Medicine, known today as A.T. Still University, which also fielded a baseball and football team in the same era.

Year–by–year record

Notable alumni
The roster of the 1911 Kirksville Osteopaths is unknown.

References

External links
Baseball Reference

Baseball teams established in 1911
Defunct minor league baseball teams
Professional baseball teams in Missouri
Baseball teams disestablished in 1911
Defunct baseball teams in Missouri
Missouri State League teams
Kirksville micropolitan area, Missouri
Adair County, Missouri